Incarnations may refer to:

Incarnations (album), a 1995 album by New Zealand-Australian band Dragon
The Incarnations, a 2014 novel by Susan Barker

See also
Incarnation of supernatural or religious entities
Incarnations of Immortality, a book series by Piers Anthony
Incarnate (Dungeons & Dragons), a character class in the role-playing game
List of people who have been considered deities by incarnation